Vito Corbelli (born 17 February 1941) is a former Sammarinese cyclist. He competed in the individual road race and team time trial events at the 1960 Summer Olympics.

References

External links
 

1941 births
Living people
Sammarinese male cyclists
Italian male cyclists
Italian people of Sammarinese descent
Olympic cyclists of San Marino
Cyclists at the 1960 Summer Olympics
Sportspeople from Rimini
Cyclists from Emilia-Romagna